Breakfast television (Europe, Canada, and Australia) or morning show (United States) is a type of news or infotainment television programme that broadcasts live in the morning (typically scheduled between 5:00 and 10:00a.m., or if it is a local programme, as early as 4:00a.m.). Often presented by a small team of hosts, these programmes are typically marketed towards the combined demography of people getting ready for work and school and stay-at-home adults and parents.

The first – and longest-running – national breakfast/morning show on television is Today, which set the tone for the genre and premiered on 14 January 1952 on NBC in the United States. For the next 70 years, Today was the number one morning program in the ratings for the vast majority of its run and since its start, many other television stations and television networks around the world have followed NBC's lead, copying that program's successful format.

Format and style
Breakfast television/morning show programs are geared toward popular and demographic appeal. The first half of a morning program is typically targeted at workforce with a focus on hard news and feature segments; often featuring updates on major stories that occurred overnight or during the previous day, politics news and interviews, reports on business and sport-related headlines, weather forecasts (either on a national or regional basis), and traffic reporting (generally common with locally produced morning shows on terrestrial television stations serving more densely populated cities, though this has begun to filter down to smaller markets as Intelligent transportation system networks have spread further into smaller communities). Later in the program, segments will typically begin to target a dominantly female demographic with a focus on "infotainment", such as human-interest, lifestyle and entertainment stories. Many local or regional morning shows feature field reports highlighting local events, attractions and/or businesses, in addition to those involving stories that occurred during the overnight or expected to happen in the coming day.

Morning programs that air across national networks may offer a break for local stations or affiliates to air a brief news update segment during the show, which typically consists of a recap of major local news headlines, along with weather and, in some areas, traffic reports. In the United States, some morning shows also allow local affiliates to incorporate a short local forecast into a national weather segment – a list of forecasts for major U.S. cities are typically shown on affiliates which do not produce such a "cut-in" segment.

During the early morning hours (generally before 10:00a.m. local time), local anchors will mention the current time – sometimes, along with the current temperature – in various spots during the newscast, while national anchors of shows covering more than one time zone will mention the current time as "xx" minutes after the hour or before the hour; the time and/or temperature are also usually displayed within the station or programme's digital on-screen graphic during most segments within the broadcast. (Most local stations originally displayed the current time and temperature only during their morning newscasts, though many began to extend this display within their logo bug to their midday and evening newscasts starting in the mid-1990s, starting in major markets and eventually expanding to stations in smaller markets.) Especially with their universal expansion to cable news outlets in the early 2000s, many news-oriented morning shows also incorporate news tickers showing local, national and/or international headlines; weather forecasts; sport scores; and, in some jurisdictions where one operates, lottery numbers from the previous drawing day during the broadcast (although these may be shown during rolling news blocks or throughout the programming day on cable news outlets, some local stations that have utilized tickers solely for their morning shows have extended them to later newscasts, whereas others only display them during their morning news programs).

The three breakfast morning shows in the United States (CBS Mornings, Today, and Good Morning America) air live only in the Eastern Time Zone. (Spanish-language shows air live in the Eastern, Central, and Mountain time zones.) Stations in the remaining time zones receive these programs on a tape delay, with an updated feed broadcast to viewers in the Pacific Time Zone. In the event of an urgent breaking news story of importance or occasional special events such as presidential inaugurations and coverage of royal weddings, these shows will go live coast-to-coast.

History

United States

Network and local programs
The first morning news program was Three To Get Ready, a local production hosted by comedian Ernie Kovacs that aired on WPTZ (now KYW-TV) in Philadelphia from 1950 to 1952. Although the program (named after WPTZ's channel number, 3) was mostly entertainment-oriented, the program did feature some news and weather segments. Its success prompted NBC to look at producing something similar on a national basis. Following the lead of NBC's Today, which debuted in January 1952, and was the first morning news program to be aired nationally, many other broadcast stations and television networks around the world followed and imitated that program's enormously successful format with news, lifestyle features, and personality.

CBS, in contrast, has struggled since television's early age to maintain a long-term morning program. Though it initially tried to mimic Today when it debuted a morning show in a two-hour format in 1954, the show was reduced to one hour within a year in order to make room for the new children's television series Captain Kangaroo. The network abandoned the morning show in 1957. From the late 1960s throughout the 1970s, the CBS Morning News aired as a straight one-hour morning newscast that had a high rate of turnover among its anchors. In January 1979, the network launched the innovative "___day Morning" series, which focused more on lifestyle and feature reports; this format, however, was relegated exclusively to Sundays after two years, and still airs under the title CBS News Sunday Morning. It was not until 1982 that Captain Kangaroo ended its run on weekdays (before ending altogether in 1984), allowing CBS to expand its morning show to a full two hours. However, the high rate of turnover among anchors returned. An ill-fated comedic revamp of the show, The Morning Program, debuted in 1987. After that, however, came This Morning, which has so far had the longest run of any of CBS' morning show attempts. This Morning was eventually cancelled 12 years later, being replaced by The Early Show in 1999; The Early Show, in turn, ceded to the new version of CBS This Morning (this time featuring a format focused more on hard news and interviews, excising lifestyle and infotainment segments) in January 2012.

ABC was a latecomer to the morning show competition. Instead of carrying a national show, it instead adopted the AM franchise introduced by many of its local stations in 1970. KABC-TV's AM Los Angeles launched the national career of Regis Philbin and was a direct predecessor to his syndicated talk show Live! AM Chicago on WLS-TV would later evolve into The Oprah Winfrey Show. The Morning Exchange on WEWS-TV was Cleveland's entry into the franchise; with its light format, ABC (after a brief but failed effort to launch the Los Angeles version nationally as AM America) launched a national program based closely on the format of The Morning Exchange and Good Day! (From WCVB-TV in Boston) in November 1975 under the title Good Morning America. GMA has traditionally run in second place (ahead of CBS but behind Today), but has surpassed Today in the ratings a few times in its history (first in the early 1980s, then from the late 1980s to the mid 1990s and again regularly since 2012). Since the 1980s, Live! (now hosted by Kelly Ripa and Ryan Secrest) has been produced and distributed by ABC's syndication arm, primarily for ABC stations (although not exclusively, as it is carried on stations affiliated with other networks), but produced by ABC's New York City owned-and-operated station, WABC-TV.

PBS, the United States's primary publicly funded broadcast network, has historically aired children's programming and Lilias, Yoga and You during the morning hours. From 1974 to 1995, PBS, through its affiliate Maryland Public Television, offered A.M. Weather, a 15-minute weather update staffed by the National Weather Service.

Fox, the last of the "Big Four" broadcast networks, does not have a morning show and has only once attempted such a program; the network attempted to transition sister cable network FX's Breakfast Time to Fox as Fox After Breakfast in 1996, to little success, but instead has ceded to its local affiliates and Fox Television Stations, which have programmed fully local morning news programs that are at parity or have overtaken their Big Three network counterparts.

The CW (and before that, its co-predecessor The WB) carried The Daily Buzz for its The CW Plus (as well as its The WB 100+ Station Group) from 2002 to 2014, in lieu of a national program; that program was also mainly syndicated to affiliates of The CW and MyNetworkTV (and predecessors The WB and UPN) as well as several independent stations until its abrupt cancellation in April 2015. Generally since then, outside of a few select CW and MyNetworkTV affiliates, stations usually program Infomercial, a local extension of a Big Three sister station's morning newscast during national morning shows, or as Sinclair Broadcast Group did from July 2017 until March 2019, returned to programming for children under the KidsClick block. Sinclair intends to program a national morning rolling newscast for those stations by the first quarter of 2021.

A few of the major Spanish language broadcast networks also produce morning shows, which are often more festive in format. ¡Despierta América! (Wake Up America!) is the longest-running Spanish language morning program on U.S. network television having aired on Univision since April 1997; Telemundo made several failed attempts at hard news and traditional morning shows during the 1990s and 2000s before it finally experienced success with Un Nuevo Día (A New Day), which launched in 2008 under the title ¡Levántate! (Get Up), and became a formidable competitor to its longer established rival following a 2011 format retooling.

Local television stations began producing their own morning shows in the 1970s, most of which mirrored the format of their network counterparts, mixing news and weather segments with talk and lifestyle features; stations in many mid-sized and smaller markets with heavy rural populations also produced farm reports, featuring stories about people and events in rural communities, list of agricultural product exchanges data from the previous day and weather forecasts tailored to farmers (although the number of these programs have dwindled on the local level since the 1990s, three such programs still exist in national syndication, the weekdaily AgDay and the weekend-only U.S. Farm Report and This Week in Agribusiness (the latter of which was founded and remains hosted by former U.S. Farm Report personalities Orion Samuelson and Max Armstrong), which have also received national distribution on cable and satellite via RFD-TV; the latter program had also previously aired on WGN America until 2008).

More traditional local newscasts began taking hold in morning timeslots (mainly on stations that maintain their own news departments) in the late 1980s and early 1990s. These programs began as half-hour or one-hour local newscasts that aired immediately before the national shows. However, since that time, they have slowly expanded, either by pushing an earlier start time or by adding additional hours on other stations that are owned, managed or which outsource their local news content to that station, thereby competing with the network shows. Similarly, following the launch of Fox in the late 1980s, many news-producing stations affiliated with major networks not among the traditional "Big Three television networks" or which operate as independent stations began producing morning newscasts that compete in part with national counterparts in part or the entirety of the 7:00 to 9:00a.m. time period; by the late 2000s, these stations began to expand their morning shows into the 9:00a.m. hour (where they normally compete with syndicated programs on ABC and CBS stations, and the third hour of Today on NBC stations). The expansion of news on Fox affiliates, along with advertising restrictions involving with the Children's Television Act, effectively ended the morning children's television market on broadcast television by the mid-2000s.

Beginning in the early 2010s, stations began experimenting with 4:30a.m. and even 4:00a.m. newscasts in some major markets (and even gradually expanding into mid-size and some smaller markets), pushing local news further into what traditionally is known as an overnight graveyard slot. Some local morning newscasts, which formerly had both softer "morning" musical and graphical packages and lighter news, along with feature segments with local businesses and organizations, now resemble their later-day counterparts with hard news coverage of overnight events. Some locally produced morning shows that utilize a mainly infotainment format still exist, most prominently among some large and mid-market stations owned by the E. W. Scripps Company (which inherited the Morning Blend format originated in 2006 by the Journal Media Group following its 2015 acquisition of that company's stations) and Tegna Inc. (which inherited many of the local talk/lifestyle shows originated by Belo – such as Good Morning Texas on Dallas ABC affiliate WFAA – prior to the 2014 acquisition of the latter group by the predecessor broadcasting unit of the Gannett), and often serving as lead-outs of national network morning shows.

Pay television
Cable news outlets have adopted the morning show format as well. Fox & Friends on Fox News, Early Start and CNN This Morning on CNN respectively follow the networks' morning show format. MSNBC's Way Too Early with Jonathan Lemire and Morning Joe follows a format more reminiscent of talk radio and incorporates panel discussions; it is also the only conservative show in the network's otherwise liberal-leaning lineup. Also following the "talk radio on TV" format is Fox Business' Imus in the Morning (a video simulcast of the radio program, which itself aired on MSNBC until 2007), ESPN2's Golic and Wingo, CBS Sports Network's The Morning Show with Boomer (formerly on MSG Network), and NFL Network's Good Morning Football. The Weather Channel originally has long featured forecast programs with a primary emphasis on business travelers and work commuters (including WeatherScope AM, Weather Center AM and Morning Rush); however with its shift toward a mix of weather and infotainment programs, it has begun featuring personality-driven morning shows: currently Wake Up With Al (hosted by Today weather anchor Al Roker, which also incorporates features and interview segments similar to that found on Today and other morning programs) and America's Morning Headquarters (hosted by former Good Morning America weather anchor Sam Champion, which has a more straight weather format with some feature segments).

Entertainment channels such as VH1 and E! have also aired morning shows (such as Big Morning Buzz Live and That Morning Show, and the 2020 version of E! News). NBCSN (as NBC Sports Network) briefly aired a highlight-intensive morning show, The 'Lights, with virtually no conversation (or even any on-camera anchor) and consisting only of highlights and scores of daytime and evening sporting events that occurred the previous day (NBCSN later abandoned this approach in favor of sports talk programming). ESPN's morning programming consists of an early episode of SportsCenter summarizing the night's highlights, followed by a traditional sports talk show, Get Up!.

United Kingdom
In the United Kingdom, breakfast television typically runs from 6:00a.m. to 9:15 or 10:00a.m.

Television broadcasting hours in the United Kingdom until early 1972 was tightly regulated and controlled by the British government under the control of the Postmaster-General. Restrictions were placed on how many hours per day could be used by broadcasters for television.  By the mid-1960s, this was allocated at seven hours per day (Mondays to Fridays) and 7.5 hours per day (Saturdays and Sundays), thus providing a 50-hour broadcasting limit per week. Certain programming was exempt from these restrictions (schools, adult education, religion, sport) however there was no allocated time provided for the establishment of breakfast television until the early 1970s.

In January 1972, under the then Conservative government, the Minister for Posts and Telecommunications, Christopher Chataway announced to the British parliament all restrictions imposed would be lifted and broadcasting hours per day could now be set by the individual broadcaster.  By October 1972, both BBC and ITV were provided daytime television, with the commercial channel ITV taking full advantage of the relaxed broadcasting hours.

However, due to financial issues and the economic problems of the 1970s, breakfast television was put "on the back burner" for the remainder of the 1970s.

After a nine-week trial-run in 1977 on the regional television stations Yorkshire Television and Tyne Tees Television, the Independent Broadcasting Authority considered breakfast television so important that it created an entire franchise for the genre, becoming the only national independent television franchise other than news service ITN. At the end of 1980, this franchise was awarded to TV-am. However, launch delays for TV-am allowed the BBC to launch its own morning programme, Breakfast Time on 17 January 1983. TV-am, with Good Morning Britain as its flagship programme, launched just over two weeks later on 1 February. TV-am struggled at first because of a format that was considered to be stodgy and formal compared to the more relaxed magazine style of the BBC's Breakfast Time, and a reliance on advertising income from a timeslot during which people were not accustomed to watching television. However, it eventually flourished only to lose its licence in 1993, after being outbid by GMTV.

In 2010, ITV plc, which by then owned 75% of GMTV, acquired the remaining 25% stake that The Walt Disney Company had owned, gaining full control of the station. In September 2010, the full legal name was changed from "GMTV Limited" to "ITV Breakfast Limited", with GMTV closing on 3 September and Daybreak and Lorraine launching on 6 September 2010. ITV experienced major trouble with the slot as well; Daybreak was eventually cancelled in 2014 due to low ratings and was replaced by Good Morning Britain on 28 April 2014. The series continues to trail BBC Breakfast consistently and has marketed with the traditional Today format mixed with political debates. One of the co-hosts was Piers Morgan, until his departure in 2021, and the programme used his notoriety as a marketing point, to middling success.

There are no breakfast television programmes on local television stations in the UK although for a brief period in the late 2000s, now-defunct local channel Channel M broadcast a breakfast programme called Channel M Breakfast.

Since its launch in 2021, news channel GB News has aired a breakfast show called The Great British Breakfast, originally being anchored by three presenters in the style of Fox & Friends, it soon shifting to a two-anchor format.

List of morning television shows
The following is a country-ordered list of breakfast television and morning show programs, past and present, with indication of a program's producing network or channel:

Albania

Argentina

Australia

Current

Former

Austria

Current

Former

Azerbaijan

Bosnia and Herzegovina

Brazil

Brunei

Bulgaria

Canada

Current

Global morning newscasts
All Global stations, with the exceptions of Global Okanagan and Global Lethbridge, air their own local morning shows titled Global News Morning. In May 2015, Global made changes to their Morning News programs east of Alberta; instead of the entire show being anchored locally, 16 minutes of each hour is anchored in Toronto for national and international news stories. Each Morning News program starts at 6 a.m. and ends at 9 a.m., with the exception of Global BC, Global Calgary, and Global Edmonton, which start their broadcasts at 5 a.m.. These three stations also air weekend editions of Morning News which start at 7 a.m. and end at 10 a.m. on Saturdays and Sundays. In 2013, Global Toronto's The Morning Show was extended by half an hour. The additional half-hour is broadcast on every Global station at 9 a.m..

Former

Chile

Current

Several regional morning shows also exist on Chilean television.

Former

China

Colombia

Current

Former

Costa Rica

Croatia

Czech Republic

Denmark

Current

Former

Estonia

European

Finland

Current

Former

Fiji

France

Current

Former

Germany

Current

Former

Greece

Current

Former

Hong Kong

Hungary

Current

Former

Iceland

India

Indonesia
Most of these programs are the morning edition of its respective flagship news program, and hard news in format. Some of them, especially the news-oriented network, has two morning news programmes - while the first are the hard news, the latter are the talk show format.

Current

Former

Ireland

Current

Israel

Current

Former

Italy

Current

Former

Japan

Kosovo

Laos

Latvia

Current

Former

Lithuania

Malaysia

Current

Former

Malta

Mexico

Current

Former

Montenegro

Morocco

Current

Netherlands

Current

Former

New Zealand

Current

Former

Norway

Current

Former

Pakistan

Panama

Current

Former

Paraguay

Peru

Philippines

Current

Former

Poland

Current

Former

Portugal

Puerto Rico

Romania

Russia

Current

Former

Serbia

Current

Former

Singapore

Current

Former

Slovakia

Current

Former

Slovenia

Current

Former

South Africa

South Korea

Current

Former

Spain

Current

Former

Sri Lanka

Sweden

Current

Former

Switzerland

Thailand

Current

Former

Trinidad and Tobago

United Kingdom

Current

Former

United States

Current

Locally produced programs featuring a franchise title on affiliates of Fox, the CW, MyNetworkTV, independent stations and associated Big Three television networks (ABC, CBS and NBC):
 Daybreak - This title is used by WISH-TV in Indianapolis to brand its morning newscasts, and has been branded Daybreak for as long WISH-TV has produced Morning Newscasts, and when they were once affiliated with CBS.  Daybreak is also used  by Gray Television's KKCO/KJCT-LP in Grand Junction, Colorado.  
 Good Day – Fox's local morning news show format is used by both stations that are either owned-and-operated or affiliated with the network (i.e., Good Day L.A. in Los Angeles). The program may have a different name in several markets (e.g., Fox 6 WakeUp News on WITI in Milwaukee), but the format is the same from market to market.  WAGA-TV adopted the name of their local morning newscast Good Day Atlanta in 1992 while still affiliated with CBS and taking the place of the first incarnation of CBS This Morning.  ABC affiliate WATN-TV in Memphis which was once affiliated with Fox uses the title Good Day Memphis for their morning newscasts.
 Good Morning [region] – used by local ABC affiliates to complement Good Morning America (e.g., Good Morning Twin Tiers on WENY in Elmira, New York).  KTVK which was once an ABC affiliate from 1955 until 1996 and is now an Independent/CBS alternate station; continues to use the title Good Morning Arizona for their morning newscast that runs from 4:30 a.m. until 10:00 a.m. WHBQ-TV, a Fox affiliated station in Memphis but once affiliated with ABC uses the title Good Morning Memphis for their morning newscasts. 
 An earlier variant is A.M. [region] (such as with AM Buffalo on WKBW-TV in Buffalo, New York), which was later adapted by ABC for AM America, a short-lived morning show that aired on the network for eleven months in 1975 before it chose to adapt Cleveland affiliate WEWS' local program The Morning Exchange into the future national format for Good Morning America. The 1980s PBS program A.M. Weather also used the same title form.
 [Station Calls/Branding] Morning News – The defunct Tribune Broadcasting's local morning news show format usually seen on the company's Fox- and CW-affiliated stations (such as WPIX in New York City, New York; WGN-TV in Chicago; KTLA in Los Angeles; KCPQ in Seattle; and WXIN in Indianapolis), though this format has also been used on Fox and CW stations – as well as a few ABC, CBS and NBC stations – not owned by Tribune (such as the Fox 25 Morning News on KOKH in Oklahoma City) under a more generic title form. Tribune was purchased by Nexstar Media Group in 2019, with WPIX sold to the E. W. Scripps Company at the same time (WITI and KCPQ were sold to Fox Television Stations in March 2020), though no changes are expected to any of those programs or their titling.  Scripps sold WPIX to Mission Broadcasting in 2020, which allows Nexstar to operate the station.
 [Station Calls/Branding] This Morning – used primarily on CBS owned-and-operated stations and affiliates (such as CBS 2 News This Morning on WCBS-TV in New York City). It has been used by CBS stations for their newscasts since prior to the 1999 cancellation of the first incarnation of CBS This Morning; the name and format has also been sporadically used on non-CBS affiliates. Some CBS stations renamed their program to The [Branding/Calls] Early Show to match the national title of CBS's 1999–2012 morning program.
 A variant of this branding is simply titled Mornings, and has been adopted by CBS as the name of their current Morning program.  Currently used by Scripps KNXV-TV (ABC) and sister station KASW (CW) in Phoenix for their respected morning newscast that airs on both stations. 
 Today in [region] or [Branding/calls] Today – used by NBC affiliates to complement Today (such as Today in Central New York on WSTM-TV in Syracuse, New York); Fox affiliate WSVN in Miami brands its morning newscast Today in Florida, that station has used the title since 1988 when it was an NBC affiliate, even after the morning newscast on the market's NBC O&O WTVJ began to use the similar title Today in South Florida. Similarly, sister station WHDH in Boston retained its morning show title Today in New England despite losing their NBC affiliation at the start of 2017; replacement NBC O&O station WBTS-CD uses the title NBC Boston Today.
 Wake Up – also used primarily on CBS affiliates, often with the city name or local region after it (such as Wake Up Rochester on WROC-TV in Rochester, New York and Wake Up Western Slope on KREX-TV in Grand Junction, Colorado). In the example of WITI's Fox 6 WakeUp News noted above, that station has used the title since 1992 when it was a CBS affiliate, with the program adapting to the Fox local morning format after 1995.  Wake Up was briefly used as the main title of the long running Captain Kangaroo children's show (which ran for 29 years on CBS from 1955 until 1984) in 1981.
Several stations throughout the United States use their own title forms to reflect their local character; for instance, KLFY-TV in Lafayette, Louisiana titles their morning show as Passe Partout (which has been on the station since 1957) to reflect the area's Cajun/Creole roots.

Former

Uruguay

Current

Former

Venezuela

Vietnam

Current

Former

See also
 Digital television
 Prime time – the evening equivalent of breakfast television/morning show

Notes

External links

 
Television terminology
Television genres